Hans-Joachim Marseille (13 December 1919 – 30 September 1942) was a German Luftwaffe fighter pilot and flying ace during World War II. He is noted for his aerial battles during the North African Campaign and his Bohemian lifestyle. One of the most successful fighter pilots, he was nicknamed the "Star of Africa". Marseille claimed all but seven of his 158 victories against the British Commonwealth's Desert Air Force over North Africa, flying the Messerschmitt Bf 109 fighter for his entire combat career. No other pilot claimed as many Western Allied aircraft as Marseille.

List of aerial victories claimed
According to Obermaier, Marseille was credited with 158 aerial victories claimed in 382 combat missions. The German Federal Archives still hold records for 109 of Marseille aerial victories. A further biographer of Marseille, Walter Wübbe, has made an attempt to link these records to Allied units, squadrons and when possible even to individual pilots, in order to verify the claims as much as possible. The dates and times detailed below are based on Wübbe; the information provided on the identity of enemy units and personnel is taken from multiple sources. Mathews and Foreman, authors of Luftwaffe Aces – Biographies and Victory Claims, researched the German Federal Archives and found records for 152 aerial victory claims, plus seven further unconfirmed claims. All of these victories were claimed over the Western Allies.

Notes

References

Citations

Bibliography

 
 
 
 
 
 
 
 
 
 
 
 
 
 
 
 
 
 
 
 
 
 
 
 
 

Aerial victories of Marseille, Hans-Joachim
Marseille, Hans-Joachim
Aviation in World War II